The Men's pair at the 2014 Commonwealth Games, was part of the lawn bowls competition, which took place between 24 and 28 July 2014 at the Kelvingrove Lawn Bowls Centre.

Sectional play

Section A

Section B

Section C

Section D

Knockout stage

Quarterfinals

Semifinals

Finals

Gold medal

Bronze medal

References

Lawn bowls at the 2014 Commonwealth Games